Daniel Zaccanti (born 27 November 1978) is an Argentine retired football striker.

Career
He started his career with Racing Club in Argentina before moving to Italy where he played for Entella and Isernia. He then joined KF Tirana in Albania in the summer of 2002, before playing for both Shkumbini Peqin and Dinamo Tirana during the 2002–03 Albanian Superliga. He played for KF Tirana during the 2003–04 campaign before returning to Italy with Nuova Albano and Savona the following season. He then had a short stint in Switzerland with FC Luzern while they were in the second tier of Swiss football. From there he went on to play for FC Carl Zeiss Jena, SpVgg Bayern Hof and TSV Crailsheim in Germany. In 2008, he signed for SpVgg Bayern Hof for a second time and joined on 9 February 2010 back to Argentina.

References

1978 births
Expatriate footballers in Albania
Argentine expatriate sportspeople in Germany
Expatriate footballers in Switzerland
Argentine expatriate footballers
Argentine footballers
Racing Club de Avellaneda footballers
FC Carl Zeiss Jena players
Argentine expatriate sportspeople in Switzerland
Expatriate footballers in Germany
FC Luzern players
Argentine expatriate sportspeople in Albania
Kategoria Superiore players
FK Dinamo Tirana players
KF Tirana players
KS Shkumbini Peqin players
Living people
Club Atlético Fénix players
Association football forwards
Footballers from Buenos Aires